Binev may refer to:

Nikolay Binev, Bulgarian actor
Slavcho Binev (b. 1965), Bulgarian actor
Vasil Binev (b. 1957), Bulgarian actor
Binev, Iran, a city in East Azerbaijan Province, Iran